What the Water Gave Me may refer to:
 What the Water Gave Me (painting), 1938 painting by Frida Kahlo
 What the Water Gave Me (song), 2011 song by Florence and the Machine
 What the Water Gave Me: Poems after Frida Kahlo, a collection of poems by Pascale Petit